The Xiaolin–Lishan railway is a single-track railway line in Suizhou, Hubei, China. The line was electrified in the mid-2010s. The line has been used for non-stop passenger services, but there are no passenger stations.

At its northern terminus near Xiaolin, it meets the Nanjing–Xi'an railway. At its southern terminus near Lishan, the line meets the Hankou–Danjiangkou railway.

References

Railway lines in China
Railway lines opened in 2005